The Representation of the People Act 1867, 30 & 31 Vict., c. 102 (known as the Reform Act 1867 or the Second Reform Act) is an Act of the British Parliament that enfranchised part of the urban male working class in England and Wales for the first time. It took effect in stages over the next two years, culminating in full commencement on 1 January 1869.

Before the Act, only one million of the seven million adult men in England and Wales could vote; the Act immediately doubled that number. Further, by the end of 1868 all male heads of household could vote, having abolished the widespread mechanism of the deemed rentpayer or ratepayer being a superior lessor or landlord who would act as middleman for those monies paid ("compounding"). The Act introduced a near-negligible redistribution of seats, far short of the urbanisation and population growth since 1832.

The overall intent was to help the Conservative Party, Benjamin Disraeli expecting a reward for his sudden and sweeping backing of the reforms discussed, yet it resulted in their loss of the 1868 general election.

Background
For the decades after the Great Reform Act of 1832 (the First Reform Act), cabinets (in that era leading from both Houses) had resisted attempts to push through further reform, and in particular left unfulfilled the six demands of the Chartist movement. After 1848, this movement declined rapidly, but elite opinion began to pay attention. It was thus only 27 years after the initial, quite modest, Great Reform Act that leading politicians thought it prudent to introduce further electoral reform. Following an unsuccessful attempt by Benjamin Disraeli to introduce a reform bill in 1859, Lord John Russell, who had played a major role in passing the 1832 Reform Act, attempted this in 1860; but the Prime Minister, Lord Palmerston, a fellow Liberal, was against any further electoral reform.

The Union victory in the American Civil War in 1865 emboldened the forces in Britain that demanded more democracy and public input into the political system, to the dismay of the upper class landed gentry who identified with the US Southern States planters and feared the loss of influence and a popular radical movement. Influential commentators included Walter Bagehot, Thomas Carlyle, Anthony Trollope, Karl Marx and John Stuart Mill. Proponents used two arguments: the balance of the constitution and "moral right". They emphasized that deserving, skilled, sober, thrifty, and deferential artisans deserve the franchise. Liberal William Gladstone emphasized the "moral" improvement of workingmen and felt that they should therefore have the opportunity of "demonstrating their allegiance to their betters". However the opposition warned against the low-class democracy of the United States and Australia.

Palmerston's death in 1865 opened the floodgates for reform. In 1866 Russell (Earl Russell as he had been since 1861, and now Prime Minister for the second time), introduced a Reform Bill. It was a cautious bill, which proposed to enfranchise "respectable" working men, excluding unskilled workers and what was known as the "residuum", those seen by MPs as the "feckless and criminal" poor. This was ensured by a £7 annual rent qualification to vote—or 2 shillings and 9 pence (2s 9d) a week. This entailed two "fancy franchises", emulating measures of 1854, a £10 lodger qualification for the boroughs, and a £50 savings qualification in the counties. Liberals claimed that "the middle classes, strengthened by the best of the artisans, would still have the preponderance of power".

When it came to the vote, however, this bill split the Liberal Party: a split partly engineered by Benjamin Disraeli, who incited those threatened by the bill to rise up against it. On one side were the reactionary conservative Liberals, known as the Adullamites; on the other were pro-reform Liberals who supported the Government. The Adullamites were supported by Tories and the liberal Whigs were supported by radicals and reformists.

The bill was thus defeated and the Liberal government of Russell resigned.

Birth of the Act

The Conservatives formed a ministry on 26 June 1866, led by Lord Derby as Prime Minister and Disraeli as Chancellor of the Exchequer. They were faced with the challenge of reviving Conservatism: Palmerston, the powerful Liberal leader, was dead and the Liberal Party split and defeated.  Thanks to manoeuvring by Disraeli, Derby's Conservatives saw an opportunity to be a strong, viable party of government; however, there was still a Liberal majority in the House of Commons.

The Adullamites, led by Robert Lowe, had already been working closely with the Conservative Party. The Adullamites were anti-reform, as were the Conservatives, but the Adullamites declined the invitation to enter into Government with the Conservatives as they thought that they could have more influence from an independent position. Despite the fact that he had blocked the Liberal Reform Bill, in February 1867, Disraeli introduced his own Reform Bill into the House of Commons.

By this time the attitude of many in the country had ceased to be apathetic regarding reform of the House of Commons.  Huge meetings, especially the ‘Hyde Park riots', and the feeling that many of the skilled working class were respectable, had persuaded many that there should be a Reform Bill.  However, wealthy Conservative MP Lord Cranborne resigned his government ministry in disgust at the bill's introduction.

The Reform League, agitating for universal suffrage, became much more active, and organized demonstrations of hundreds of thousands of people in Manchester, Glasgow, and other towns. Though these movements did not normally use revolutionary language as some Chartists had in the 1840s, they were powerful movements. The high point came when a demonstration in May 1867 in Hyde Park was banned by the government. Thousands of troops and policemen were prepared, but the crowds were so huge that the government did not dare to attack. The Home Secretary, Spencer Walpole, was forced to resign.

Faced with the possibility of popular revolt going much further, the government rapidly included into the bill amendments which enfranchised far more people. Consequently, the bill was more far-reaching than any Members of Parliament had thought possible or really wanted; Disraeli appeared to accept most reform proposals, so long as they did not come from William Ewart Gladstone. An amendment tabled by the opposition (but not by Gladstone himself) trebled the new number entitled to vote under the bill; yet Disraeli simply accepted it. The bill enfranchised most men who lived in urban areas. The final proposals were as follows: a borough franchise for all who paid rates in person (that is, not compounders), and extra votes for graduates, professionals and those with over £50 savings. These last "fancy franchises" were seen by Conservatives as a weapon against a mass electorate.

However, Gladstone attacked the bill; a series of sparkling parliamentary debates with Disraeli resulted in the bill becoming much more radical. Having been given his chance by the belief that Gladstone's bill had gone too far in 1866, Disraeli had now gone further.

Disraeli was able to persuade his party to vote for the bill on the basis that the newly enfranchised electorate would be grateful, and would vote Conservative at the next election. Despite this prediction, in 1868 the Conservatives lost the first general election in which the newly enfranchised electors voted.

The bill ultimately aided the rise of the radical wing of the Liberal Party, and helped Gladstone to victory. The Act was tidied up with many further Acts to alter electoral boundaries.

Provisions of the Act

Reduced representation

Disenfranchised boroughs 
Four electoral boroughs were disenfranchised by the Act, for corruption, their last number of MPs shown as blocks:

Totnes, Devon ■■
Great Yarmouth, Norfolk ■■
Lancaster, Lancashire ■■
Reigate, Surrey ■

Seven English boroughs were disenfranchised by the Representation of the People (Scotland) Act 1868 the next year, their last number of MPs shown as blocks:

Arundel, Sussex ■
Ashburton, Devon ■
Dartmouth, Devon ■
Honiton, Devon ■■
Lyme Regis, Dorset ■
Thetford, Norfolk ■■
Wells, Somerset ■■

Halved representation 
The following boroughs were reduced from electing two MPs to one:
Andover, Hampshire
Bodmin, Cornwall
Bridgnorth, Shropshire
Bridport, Dorset
Buckingham, Buckinghamshire
Chichester, Sussex
Chippenham, Wiltshire
Cirencester, Gloucestershire
Cockermouth, Cumberland
Devizes, Wiltshire
Dorchester, Dorset
Evesham, Worcestershire
Guildford, Surrey
Harwich, Essex
Hertford, Hertfordshire
Huntingdon, Huntingdonshire
Knaresborough, West Riding of Yorkshire
Leominster, Herefordshire
Lewes, Sussex
Lichfield, Staffordshire
Ludlow, Shropshire
Lymington, Hampshire
Maldon, Essex
Marlow, Buckinghamshire
Malton, North Riding of Yorkshire
Marlborough, Wiltshire
Newport, Isle of Wight
Poole, Dorset
Richmond, North Riding of Yorkshire
Ripon, West Riding of Yorkshire
Stamford, Lincolnshire
Tavistock, Devon
Tewkesbury, Gloucestershire
Windsor, Berkshire
Wycombe, Buckinghamshire

Three further boroughs (Honiton, Thetford, Wells) were also due to have their representation halved under the 1867 Act, but before this reduction took effect they were disenfranchised altogether by the 1868 Scottish Reform Act as noted above.

Enfranchisements 
The Act created nine new single-member borough seats:
Burnley, Lancashire
Darlington, County Durham
Dewsbury, West Riding of Yorkshire
Gravesend, Kent
Hartlepool, County Durham
Middlesbrough, North Riding of Yorkshire
Stalybridge, Cheshire
Stockton, County Durham
Wednesbury, Staffordshire

The following two boroughs were enfranchised with two MPs:
Chelsea, Middlesex
Hackney, Middlesex

The following two were enlarged:
Salford and Merthyr Tydfil were given two MPs, up from one.
Birmingham, Leeds, Liverpool and Manchester now had three MPs, up from two.

Other changes 
The West Riding of Yorkshire divided into three districts each returning two MPs.
Cheshire, Derbyshire, Devonshire, Essex, Kent, Lincolnshire, Norfolk, Somerset, Staffordshire and Surrey divided into three districts instead of two, each returning two MPs.
Lancashire divided into four two-member districts instead of a three-member district and a two-member district.
University of London was given one seat.
Parliament was allowed to continue sitting through a Demise of the Crown.
MPs exempted from having to seek re-election upon changing offices.

Reforms in Scotland and Ireland 

The reforms for Scotland and Ireland were carried out by two subsequent acts, the Representation of the People (Ireland) Act 1868 and the Representation of the People (Scotland) Act 1868.

In Scotland, five existing constituencies gained members, and three new constituencies were formed. Two existing county constituencies were merged into one, giving an overall increase of seven members; this was offset by seven English boroughs (listed above) being disenfranchised, leaving the House with the same number of members.

The representation of Ireland remained unchanged.

Effects

Direct effects of the Act 
The slur of local bribery and corruption dogged early debates in 1867–68.  The whips' and leaders' decision to steer away discussion of electoral malpractice or irregularity to 1868's Election Petitions Act facilitated the progress of the main Reform Act.

The unprecedented extension of the franchise to all householders effectively gave the vote to many working-class men, quite a considerable change. Jonathan Parry described this as a "borough franchise revolution"; Overwhelming election of the landed class or otherwise very wealthy to the Commons would no longer be assured by money, bribery and favours, those elected would reflect the most common sentiment of local units of the public. The brand-new franchise provisions were briefly flawed; the act did not address the issues of compounding and of not being a ratepayer in a household. Compounding (counting of one's under-tenants payments and using that count as a qualification) as to all rates and rents was made illegal, abolished in the enactment of a bill tabled by Liberal Grosvenor Hodgkinson. This meant that all male tenants would have to pay the parish/local rates directly and thus thereafter qualified for the vote.

A flaw remained. The preparation of the local electoral registers (there has been no national register) was still left too easily manipulated by party organisers who could remove opponents and add supporters at will. Each local register was difficult to contest.

A 2022 study found that the Act reduced political violence in the UK.

Unintended effects
 Increased amounts of party spending and political organisation at both a local and national level—politicians had to account themselves to the increased electorate, which without secret ballots meant an increased number of voters to treat or bribe.
 The redistribution of seats actually served to make the House of Commons increasingly dominated by the upper classes. Only they could afford to pay the huge campaigning costs and the abolition of certain rotten boroughs removed some of the middle-class international merchants who had been able to obtain seats.
The Liberal Party was worried about the prospect of a socialist party taking the bulk of the working-class vote, so they moved to the left, while their rivals the Conservatives initiated occasional intrigues to encourage socialist candidates to stand against the Liberals.

Reform Act in literature
Thomas Carlyle's essay "Shooting Niagara: And After?" compares the Second Reform Act and democracy generally to plunging over Niagara Falls. His essay provoked a response from Mark Twain, "A Day at Niagara" (1869).  Trollope's Phineas Finn is concerned almost exclusively with the parliamentary progress of the Second Reform Act, and Finn sits for one of the seven fictional boroughs that are due to be disenfranchised.

See also
 Ballot Act 1872 
 Reform Acts
 Representation of the People Act
 Representation of the People Act 1884 (or Third Reform Act) 
 Representation of the People Act 1918 (Fourth Reform Act)
 Redistribution of Seats Act 1885
 Benjamin Disraeli
 William Ewart Gladstone
 Chartism

Notes
Notes 
 
References

Further reading
 Adelman, Paul. "The Second Reform Act of 1867" History Today (May 1967), Vol. 17 Issue 5, p317-325, online
 Aidt, Toke, Stanley L. Winer, and Peng Zhang. "Franchise extension and fiscal structure in the United Kingdom 1820-1913: A new test of the Redistribution Hypothesis." (2020). online; advanced statistical tests
 Blake, Robert. The Conservative Party from Peel to Churchill (1970) online.
 Cowling, Maurice. 1867, Disraeli, Gladstone, and Revolution (1967). 
 
 Evans, Eric J. Parliamentary reform in Britain, c. 1770–1918 (Routledge, 2014).
 Foot, Paul. The Vote: how it was won and how it was undermined (2005)
 Gallagher, Thomas F. "The Second Reform Movement, 1848-1867" Albion 12#2 (1980): 147–163. 
 Garrard, John A. "Parties, members and voters after 1867: a local study." Historical Journal 20.1 (1977): 145–163. online
 Goldman, Lawrence. "Social Reform and the Pressure of ‘Progress’ on Parliament, 1660–1914." Parliamentary History 37 (2018): 72-88.
 
 Husted, T. A. and L. W. Kenny. "The effect of the expansion of the voting franchise on the size of government." Journal of Political Economy  (1997) 105#1, 54–82.
 Lawrence, Jon. "Class and gender in the making of urban Toryism, 1880-1914." English Historical Review 108.428 (1993): 629–652. online
 
 St John, Ian. The Historiography of Gladstone and Disraeli (2016) ch 3.
 Saunders, Robert. “The Politics of Reform and the Making of the Second Reform Act, 1848-1867.” Historical Journal, 50#3 (2007), pp. 571–591. online.
 Saunders, Robert. Democracy and the Vote in British Politics, 1848–1867: The Making of the Second Reform Act (2013). excerpt
 Seghezza, Elena, and Pierluigi Morelli. "Suffrage extension, social identity, and redistribution: the case of the Second Reform Act." European Review of Economic History 23.1 (2018): 30–49.
 
 
 Walton, John K. The Second Reform Act (1987)
 Zimmerman, Kristin. "Liberal Speech, Palmerstonian Delay, and the Passage of the Second Reform Act." English Historical Review vol. 118 (November 2003): 1176–1202.

Primary sources

External links
 
 
 Digital reproduction of the Original Act on the Parliamentary Archives catalogue

Representation of the People Acts
United Kingdom Acts of Parliament 1867
August 1867 events